Bulia mexicana is a moth of the family Erebidae first described by Hans Hermann Behr in 1870. It is found from Chiapas in western Mexico south to north-western Costa Rica.

The larvae feed on Prosopis juliflora.

References

Moths described in 1870
mexicana